Leucetta primigenia (common names - ferruginous sponge, Rostroter Kalkschwamm) is a species of calcareous sponge in the family Leucettidae, and was first described in 1872 by Ernst Haeckel.

Distribution
The type locality is in the western Mediterranean. In Australia it is found in New South Wales coastal waters,  at depths of 3-385 m.

References

Taxa named by Ernst Haeckel
Clathrinida
Sponges described in 1872